The 1939 National Division was the 3rd edition of the Turkish National Division. Galatasaray won their first title.

Participants

Beşiktaş - 1938–39 Istanbul Football League, 1st
Fenerbahçe - 1938–39 Istanbul Football League, 2nd
Galatasaray - 1938–39 Istanbul Football League, 3rd
Vefa - 1938–39 Istanbul Football League, 4th
Ankara Demirspor - Ankara Football League, 1st
AS-FA Gücü - Ankara Football League, 2nd
Doğanspor - İzmir Football League, 1st
Ateşspor - İzmir Football League, 2nd

League standings

Results

References
 Erdoğan Arıpınar; Tevfik Ünsi Artun, Cem Atabeyoğlu, Nurhan Aydın, Ergun Hiçyılmaz, Haluk San, Orhan Vedat Sevinçli, Vala Somalı (June 1992). Türk Futbol Tarihi (1904-1991) vol.1, Page(80-81), Türkiye Futbol Federasyonu Yayınları.

Turkish National Division Championship seasons
1938–39 in Turkish football
Turkey